Wyatt at the Coyote Palace is the ninth studio album by American musician Kristin Hersh. It was released on November 11, 2016 in the form of a book and album, through Omnibus Press.

Critical reception
Wyatt at the Coyote Palace was met with "generally favorable" reviews from critics. At Metacritic, which assigns a weighted average rating out of 100 to reviews from mainstream publications, this release received an average score of 80, based on 10 reviews. Aggregator Album of the Year gave the release a 76 out of 100 based on a critical consensus of 6 reviews.

Track listing

References

2016 albums
Kristin Hersh albums